Michael Hawking (born 1 June 1952) is a former Australian rules footballer who played with North Melbourne in the Victorian Football League (VFL).

Originally from Ovens and Murray Football League (O&MFL) club Rutherglen, Hawking played three games for North Melbourne before transferring to Penguin Football Club in Tasmania's North West Football Union (NWFU) as a fly-in, fly-out player. He joined Victorian Football Association (VFA) club Caulfield in 1975, playing 87 matches for them until his retirement in 1980.

References

Sources
Piesse, K. (2010) The Bears Uncensored, Cricketbooks.com.au: Melbourne.

External links 

Living people
1952 births
Australian rules footballers from Victoria (Australia)
North Melbourne Football Club players
Rutherglen Football Club players
Caulfield Football Club players
Penguin Football Club players